The Sprague, Brown, and Knowlton Store is a historic building located in Winterset, Iowa, United States.  Built in 1866 to house a dry goods store, it is an early example of a vernacular limestone commercial building.  The two-story structure is composed of locally quarried ashlar and rubble  stone.  It features chamfered quoins and jambs, and a bracketed stone cornice.  Its construction has been attributed to local stonemason David Harris.  The storefront has subsequently been altered.  The building was individually listed on the National Register of Historic Places in 1987, and it was included as a contributing property in the Winterset Courthouse Square Commercial Historic District in 2015.

References

Commercial buildings completed in 1866
Winterset, Iowa
Vernacular architecture in Iowa
Buildings and structures in Madison County, Iowa
National Register of Historic Places in Madison County, Iowa
Commercial buildings on the National Register of Historic Places in Iowa
Individually listed contributing properties to historic districts on the National Register in Iowa